Rel or REL may mean:


Science and technology
 REL, a human gene
 the rel descriptor of stereochemistry, see Relative configuration
REL (Rassemblement Européen pour la Liberté), European Rally for Liberty, a defunct French far-right party active in the 1960s
 Category of relations or Rel, a mathematical category of sets and relations
 Rel (DBMS), a database management system
 Rel attribute, an HTML attribute for indicating a semantic link
 Recommended Exposure Limit, a recommended limit for occupational exposures published by the National Institute for Occupational Safety and Health
 Rights Expression Language, a machine-processable language used for digital rights management

People
 Rel Dowdell, American screenwriter, film director, film producer, and English/screenwriting educator
 Nickname of Arielle Gold, American world champion and Olympic bronze medalist snowboarder
 Rel Hunt (born 1974), Australian actor
 Nickname of Ariel Schulman (born 1981), American actor, film director, and producer

Other uses
 Rel (TV series), a 2018 American television sitcom
 Rel (time), a fictional Dalek unit of time measurement roughly equal to one second
 Magic: The Gathering Organized Play Rules Enforcement Level
 Reaction Engines Limited, a British aerospace company
 Religare Enterprises Limited, an Indian holding company
 Almirante Marcos A. Zar Airport IATA code
 Rendille language ISO 639-3 language code, spoken in Kenya

See also
 Ex rel, abbreviation of Latin ex relatione
 Relative (disambiguation)
 Rell (disambiguation)